Abrothallus nephromatis is a widely distributed species of lichenicolous fungus in the family Abrothallaceae. It was formally described as a new species in 2015 by Ave Suija and Sergio Pérez-Ortega. The species epithet refers to the host genus, Nephroma.

Abrothallus nephromatis has been collected from Africa (Tanzania, Uganda); Asia (Russian Far East); Australia and New Zealand; Europe (Italy, Norway, Sweden), Greenland, and North America (Canada, USA). It is distinguished from the similar species Abrothallus boomii by its eight-spored asci and narrower conidia, and from Abrothallus welwitschii by its smaller ascomata and smaller ascospores. The recorded hosts of the fungus are Nephroma parile, N. helveticum, N. rufum, and N. tropicum.

References

nephromatis
Lichenicolous fungi
Fungi described in 2015
Fungi of Asia
Fungi of Africa
Fungi of Australia
Fungi of Greenland
Fungi of New Zealand
Fungi of Europe
Taxa named by Ave Suija